Foreign relations exist between the alpine nations of Austria and Switzerland. Both countries have had diplomatic relations since the Middle Ages.  The Habsburgs, who ruled Austria for more than six centuries, are originally from Aargau, Switzerland. The two countries are predominantly German-speaking. Austria has an embassy in Bern, a general consulate in Zürich and seven honorary consulates (in Basel, Chur, Geneva, Lausanne, Lugano, Lucerne and St. Gallen). Switzerland has an embassy in Vienna and six honorary consulates (in Bregenz, Graz, Innsbruck, Klagenfurt, Linz, and Salzburg). Together, both countries organized the Euro 2008.

Resident diplomatic missions 
 Austria has an embassy in Bern.
 Switzerland has an embassy in Vienna.

See also 
 Foreign relations of Austria
 Foreign relations of Switzerland
 Austria–Switzerland border
 Switzerland–EU relations
 Germany–Switzerland relations

External links 
 Austrian Foreign Ministry: list of bilateral treaties with Switzerland (in German only)
 Austrian embassy in Bern (in German only)
 Austrian mission in Geneva
 Austrian consulate in Zurich (in German only) 
 Swiss Department of Foreign Affairs about the relation with Austria
 Swiss Department of Foreign Affairs: list of Swiss representation in Austria
  Swiss embassy in Vienna (in German only)

 
Switzerland
Bilateral relations of Switzerland